Verde, anil, amarelo, cor de rosa e carvão (distributed in the United States as Rose and Charcoal) is Brazilian singer Marisa Monte's third album, released in 1994. Contributors include well-known artists such as Gilberto Gil, Paulinho da Viola, Naná Vasconcelos, Carlinhos Brown, Arnaldo Antunes and the group Época de Ouro. The album includes the hits "Maria de verdade," "Na estrada," and "De mais ninguém."

It was listed by Rolling Stone Brazil as one of the 100 best Brazilian albums in history.

Track listing

Personnel
Marisa Monte: vocals
Nando Reis: acoustic guitar
Arthur Maia:bass
Jorginho Gomes: drums
Marcos Suzano: percussion
Carlinhos Brown: percussion
Arnaldo Antunes: vocals

References

1994 albums
Marisa Monte albums